iPadOS 15 is the third major release of the iPadOS operating system developed by Apple for its iPad line of tablet computers. The successor to iPadOS 14, it was announced at the company's Worldwide Developers Conference (WWDC) on June 7, 2021 along with iOS 15, macOS Monterey, watchOS 8, and tvOS 15. It was released to the public on September 20, 2021. It was succeeded by iPadOS 16, which was released on October 24, 2022.

iPadOS 15 is the final version of iPadOS that supports the iPad Air 2 and the iPad Mini 4, as its successor, iPadOS 16, drops support for those models.

Features

Home screen
The home screen grid is reduced by one row to accommodate the new widgets when placed (23 icons), and rotates in portrait orientation, just like iOS 12 and earlier.

Widgets
Widgets can now be placed directly anywhere on the home screen. There are more widgets, many of which now have a new fourth size to pick from, being extra-large.

App Library
iPadOS 15 introduces the App Library from the iPhone in iOS 14 to the iPad.

Multitasking
New multitasking user interface allows users to enter split view, slide over, enter full screen with quick gestures. The multiwindow shelf gives quick access to all running apps.

Quick Note
A new feature, called Quick Note, can be taken by swiping from the corner with fingers or the Apple Pencil, the Control Center or a keyboard shortcut.

Safari
Safari has been redesigned just like in iOS 15 and macOS Monterey.  Safari has tab groups which allow the user to organize tabs into user-defined groups. Users can download third party extensions for Safari in the App Store.

Other

Universal Control allows a user to use a single keyboard and mouse across different Macs and iPads and new keyboard shortcuts have been added in iPadOS 15.4.
The Translate app is now available in iPadOS 15.
The iPadOS 13 default wallpapers were removed in the first beta of iPadOS 15.
iPadOS 15 features a new wallpaper in two modes: light and dark.
All models of iPad now have a "Low Power Mode" option in Settings, like the iOS "Low Power Mode" option in Settings, and can also be added to the Control Center.
Supports Live Text in iPads with A12 Bionic or later.
Introduces Focus mode like in iOS 15.
The Today View has been removed and replaced by widgets placed directly anywhere on the home screen

Supported devices
All devices supporting iPadOS 14 also support iPadOS 15. Devices include:
iPad Air 2
iPad Air (3rd generation)
iPad Air (4th generation)
iPad Air (5th generation)
iPad (5th generation)
iPad (6th generation)
iPad (7th generation)
iPad (8th generation)
iPad (9th generation)
iPad Mini 4
iPad Mini (5th generation)
iPad Mini (6th generation)
iPad Pro (1st generation)
iPad Pro (2nd generation)
iPad Pro (3rd generation)
iPad Pro (4th generation)
iPad Pro (5th generation)

Releases

The first developer beta of iPadOS 15 was released on June 7, 2021, and the first public beta was released on June 30, 2021, six days after the release of the second developer beta. The second public beta was released on July 16, 2021. iPadOS 15 was officially released on September 20, 2021.

See Apple's official release notes, and official security update contents.

See also
macOS Monterey
iOS 15

References

External links
 – official site
 – official developer site
 – iOS/iPadOS Reference Library
 – Personal Safety User Guide

15
IPad
Apple Inc. operating systems
Mach (kernel)
Mobile operating systems
Products introduced in 2021
Tablet operating systems